Václav Roubík (16 August 1919 – 22 June 2013) was a Czech rower who competed in the 1948 Summer Olympics.

References

1919 births
2013 deaths
Czech male rowers
Olympic rowers of Czechoslovakia
Rowers at the 1948 Summer Olympics
Rowers from Prague
European Rowing Championships medalists